Mercedes-Benz has sold a number of automobiles with the "250" model name:
 1965–1967 W111
 1965–1967 250SE
 1966–1967 W108
 1966–1967 250S
 1966–1967 250SE
 1966–1968 W113
 1966–1968 250SL
 1968–1972 W114
 1968–1972 250
 1969–1972 250/8

250